Aida Mantawel (born 27 May 1950) is a Filipino sprinter. She competed in the women's 400 metres at the 1972 Summer Olympics.

References

1950 births
Living people
Athletes (track and field) at the 1972 Summer Olympics
Filipino female sprinters
Olympic track and field athletes of the Philippines
Place of birth missing (living people)
Olympic female sprinters